VyOS is an open source network operating system based on Debian.

VyOS provides a free routing platform that competes directly with other commercially available solutions from well known network providers. Because VyOS is run on standard amd64 systems, it is able to be used as a router and firewall platform for cloud deployments.

History
After Brocade Communications stopped development of the Vyatta Core Edition of the Vyatta Routing software, a small group of enthusiasts in 2013 took the last Community Edition, and worked on building an Open Source fork to live on in place of the end of life VC.

Features
 BGP (IPv4 and IPv6), OSPF (v2 and v3), RIP and RIPng, policy-based routing.
 IPsec, VTI, VXLAN, L2TPv3, L2TP/IPsec and PPTP servers, tunnel interfaces (GRE, IPIP, SIT), OpenVPN in client, server, or site-to-site modes, WireGuard.
 Stateful firewall, zone-based firewall, all types of source and destination NAT (one to one, one to many, many to many).
 DHCP and DHCPv6 server and relay, IPv6 RA, DNS forwarding, TFTP server, web proxy, PPPoE access concentrator, NetFlow/sFlow sensor, QoS.
 VRRP for IPv4 and IPv6, ability to execute custom health checks and transition scripts; ECMP, stateful load balancing.
 Built-in versioning.

Releases
VyOS version 1.0.0 (Hydrogen) was released on December 22, 2013. On October 9, 2014, version 1.1.0 (Helium) was released. All versions released thus far have been based on Debian 6.0 (Squeeze), and are available as a 32-bit images and 64-bit images for both physical and virtual machines.

On January 28, 2019, version 1.2.0 (Crux) was released. Version 1.2.0 is based on Debian 8 (Jessie).

While version 1.0 and 1.1 were named after elements, a new naming scheme based on constellations is used from version 1.2.

Release History

VMware Support
The VyOS OVA image for VMware was released with the February 3, 2014 maintenance release.
It allows a convenient setup of VyOS on a VMware platform and includes all of the VMware tools and paravirtual drivers.
The OVA image can be downloaded from the standard download site

Amazon EC2 Support
Starting with version 1.0.2, Amazon EC2 customers can select a VyOS AMI image. (deprecated, will be removed in February 2018)

Starting with version 1.1.7, AWS customers should use new marketplace VyOS AMI

Starting with version 1.2.0, AWS customers can deploy new marketplace AMI This new offering now comes with support

Azure Support
Starting with version 1.2.0, Azure customers can use VyOS on Azure

See also
List of router and firewall distributions

References

External links
 
 

Computer networking
Debian-based distributions
Ethernet
Free routing software
Free security software
Free software distributions
Gateway/routing/firewall distribution
Linux companies
Linux distributions
Routers (computing)
Routing software
Virtualization software
Virtual private networks